Mate Borovac (born 2 January 1963) is a Croatian retired footballer.

Club career
During his club career he played mostly for NK Neretva. In late 80s, he was one of the first Croatian (Yugoslavian at that time) players playing in Malaysia.

References

External links

personal data

1963 births
Living people
Association football midfielders
Yugoslav footballers
Croatian footballers
NK Neretva players
Johor Darul Ta'zim II F.C. players
NK Pazinka players
NK Varaždin players
Malaysia Super League players
Croatian Football League players
Yugoslav expatriate footballers
Expatriate footballers in Malaysia